Anthurium clidemioides  is a species of plant in the genus Anthurium native to Costa Rica, Panama, and Colombia. One of the more distinctive Anthuriums, it is a vining climber with almost stalkless, bullate leaves that can range from light to very dark green. Along with Anthurium flexile it is one of only two species in the genus that produces roots between nodes.

Subspecies
A. clidemioides has two identified subspecies: 

 Anthurium clidemioides subsp. clidemioides
 Anthurium clidemioides subsp. pacificum Croat & Grayum

References

External links

clidemioides
Flora of Costa Rica
Plants described in 1940